Mayoko is a town in the Mayoko District, Niari Department, east of the Republic of the Congo.

Transport 

It is served by a station on the  Mbinda branch of the Congo-Ocean Railway.

Mining 

Iron ore deposits are located near the town and the railway. Congo Mining and Exxaro both hold exploration permits nearby.

See also 

 Railway stations in Congo

References 

Niari Department
Populated places in the Republic of the Congo